The Sălanele is a left tributary of the river Sebeș in Romania. It discharges into the Lake Oașa, which is drained by the Sebeș.

References

Rivers of Romania
Rivers of Alba County